Giuseppe Pitrè (22 December 184110 April 1916) was an Italian folklorist, medical doctor, professor, and senator for Sicily. As a folklorist he is credited with extending the realm of folklore to include all manifestations of popular life. He is also considered a forerunner in the field of medical history.

Born in Palermo, after serving as a volunteer in 1860 under Garibaldi, and graduating in medicine in 1866, he threw himself into the study of literature, and wrote the first scientific studies on Italian popular culture, pioneering Italian ethnographic studies. He founded the study of "folk psychology", in Sicily, teaching at the University of Palermo.

Between 1871 and 1913, he compiled the Biblioteca delle tradizioni popolari siciliane ("Library of Sicilian popular traditions"), a collection of Sicilian oral culture in twenty-five volumes.

Pitrè's Fiabe, novelle e racconti popolari siciliani ("Sicilian Fairy Tales, Stories, and Folktales"), 1875, documenting Sicily's rich folkloric heritage derived from both European and Middle Eastern traditions, is the culmination of the great European folklore scholarship that began earlier in the 19th century. Against the cultural grain of his times, Pitrè championed the common people of Sicily and their customs, and his scholarship of oral narrative tradition is arguably as significant as that of the Brothers Grimm.

In 1880 Pitrè co-founded the folk traditions journal Archivio per lo studio delle tradizioni popolari (English: Archive for the Study of Popular Traditions), which he edited until 1906, and in 1894 he published a basic bibliography of Italian popular traditions. He was made an honorary member of the American Folklore Society in 1890. Palermo's Museo Antropologico Etnografico Siciliano was founded in his memory.

On February 12, 1915, in his capacity as a secular tarmac, together with the ecclesiastical marammiere Mons. Giuseppe Lagumina, the beneficiary sub-marammiere Baldassare Mangione, the chaplain Lorenzo Lo Verde and a few private citizens, he attended the opening of the porphyry tomb of Ruggero II in the cathedral of Palermo. Pitre was linked by a deep and ancient friendship both with Mons Lagumina, whom he considered an important point of reference for his studies, and with his brother Bartolomeo. Lagumina managed to derive an amusing question between Pitrè and Gioacchino Di Marzo regarding the flowering of the rod of San Giuseppe. Lagumina explained to Pitre that it was "a Jewish legend" and provided him with the required elucidations.

Notes

References

Brief biography
 Amedeo Benedetti, “Io vivo nel popolo e del popolo” : Contributo alla vita di Giuseppe Pitrè, “Esperienze Letterarie”, a. XXXVII (2012), n. 1, gennaio-marzo, pp. 59–84.
 Zipes, Jack. :The Indomitable Giuseppe Pitrè." Folklore, volume 120, no. 1 (April 2009): 1-18.

External links
 
 
 Martinengo-Cesaresco, Evelyn. "Giuseppe Pitrè (Obituary)" Folk-Lore. Volume 27, 1916. pp. 314–316.

Italian ethnologists
1841 births
1916 deaths
Politicians from Palermo
Italian folklorists
Folklorists of Sicilian folklore
Academic staff of the University of Palermo
Burials at San Domenico, Palermo
Physicians from Sicily